The Synod of the Christian Churches of Java, founded on 17 February 1931, is a mutual bond of Javanese Christian Churches which amounts to 307 churches in 32 presbyteries, spreading in 6 provinces in the island of Java: Yogyakarta, Central Java, East Java, West Java, Jakarta, and Banten. Its theological orientation is Reformed and has Presbyterian church government.

It is a member of World Communion of Reformed Churches

References

External links 
 Sinode GKJ 
 

1931 establishments in the Dutch East Indies
Calvinist denominations established in the 20th century
Members of the World Communion of Reformed Churches
Reformed denominations in Indonesia
Christian organizations established in 1931